HMS Hero was a 74-gun third rate ship of the line of the Royal Navy, designed by Sir Thomas Slade built by Thomas Bucknall at Plymouth Dockyard and launched on 28 March 1759. She was the only ship built to her draught.

Hero and  captured the French East Indiaman Bertin  on 3 April 1761 and sent her into Plymouth. There the Royal Navy purchased her and commissioned as the third rate .

From 1763 to 1767 Hero was commanded by Captain Paul Ourry.

She had a part in the Battle of Porto Praya, a naval battle that took place during the American Revolutionary War on 16 April 1781, between a British squadron under Commodore George Johnstone and a French squadron under the Bailli de Suffren.

Under the command of Captain Theophilus Jones, she took part in the 1783 Battle of Cuddalore.

She was converted to a prison ship in 1793, and was eventually broken up in 1810.

Citations

References

Lavery, Brian (2003) The Ship of the Line - Volume 1: The development of the battlefleet 1650-1850. Conway Maritime Press. .

Demerliac, Alain (1996) La Marine De Louis XVI: Nomenclature Des Navires Français De 1774 À 1792. (Nice: Éditions OMEGA). 

Theal, George McCall (1897) History of South Africa under the administration of the Dutch East India Company, 1652 to 1795. (S. Sonnenschein & co., Ptd.).
 Final French Struggles in India and on the Indian Seas

External links

Ships of the line of the Royal Navy
1759 ships